The Clarence H. Jones House is a house located in southeast Portland, Oregon listed on the National Register of Historic Places.

Further reading

See also
 National Register of Historic Places listings in Southeast Portland, Oregon

References

1901 establishments in Oregon
Buckman, Portland, Oregon
Houses completed in 1901
Houses on the National Register of Historic Places in Portland, Oregon
Portland Eastside MPS
Queen Anne architecture in Oregon
Portland Historic Landmarks